Selasi Berdie (born 3 February 1986) is an Australian professional rugby league footballer playing two matches with the Gold Coast Titans, as prop. He is believed to be the first player of African descent to play in the National Rugby League.

Early years
Berdie grew up in Melbourne and played tennis before taking up rugby league. Berdie graduated with a double degree in sports science and management in 2008.

Queensland Cup
In 2008 Berdie was signed by the Gold Coast Titans and was assigned to play for a feeder club, the Tweed Heads Seagulls, in the Queensland Cup.

In 2008 he played for Queensland Country and the Queensland Residents sides.

Gold Coast Titans
Berdie made his National Rugby League debut playing for the Gold Coast Titans in Round 26, 2008 and is fondly known as Big Bird.

References

External links
 Official player profile at Titans.com

1986 births
Living people
Australian rugby league players
Australian people of Ghanaian descent
Gold Coast Titans players
Tweed Heads Seagulls players
Rugby league props
Rugby league second-rows
Rugby league players from Melbourne